John Stanton Penn (November 19, 1926 - November 1, 2013) was an American politician who served in the New Jersey General Assembly from the 16th Legislative District from 1984 to 1994.

Born in Brooklyn and raised in Westfield, New Jersey. Penn attended the Wardlaw School (since renamed as the Wardlaw-Hartridge School) and Columbia College. He resided in Far Hills, New Jersey and lived in Bedminster, New Jersey at the time of his death.

References

External links

1926 births
2013 deaths
Columbia College (New York) alumni
People from Bedminster, New Jersey
People from Brooklyn
People from Far Hills, New Jersey
People from Westfield, New Jersey
Politicians from Somerset County, New Jersey
Republican Party members of the New Jersey General Assembly
Wardlaw-Hartridge School alumni